Populus is a market research company in the United Kingdom formed in 2003.

Populus co-founded the British Polling Council in 2004 and regularly publishes opinion polls on voting intention and as well as other political and commercial issues. It is also a member of the Market Research Society.

Populus conduct telephone research using random digit dialing.

In 2020 Populus became part of Yonder Consulting.

References

External links
 Populus official site

Market research companies of the United Kingdom
Public opinion research companies
Opinion polling in the United Kingdom
British companies established in 2003